Therese Lundin is the name of:

Therese Lundin (footballer), Swedish footballer
Therèse Lundin (swimmer), Swedish swimmer